Moyses Ferreira Alves (2 June 1930 – 14 August 1980), better known as Zezinho, was a Brazilian footballer. He played in three matches for the Brazil national football team in 1956. He was also part of Brazil's squad for the 1956 South American Championship.

References

External links
 

1930 births
1980 deaths
Brazilian footballers
Brazil international footballers
Association football forwards
Vitória Futebol Clube (ES) players
Rio Branco Esporte Clube players
Botafogo de Futebol e Regatas players
CR Flamengo footballers
São Paulo FC players
Associação Portuguesa de Desportos players
Sport Club Corinthians Paulista players
Santos FC players
Santa Cruz Futebol Clube players
América Futebol Clube (SP) players